The dairy industry in the United States includes the farms, cooperatives, and companies that produce milk and cheese and related products, such as milking machines, and distribute them to the consumer. By 1925, the United States had 1.5-2 million dairy cows, each producing an average of 4200 lb of milk per year. By 2007, there were 9.1 million dairy cows but their average milk production was over 20,000 pounds per year, with eight pounds per gallon.

History
European dairy practices varied from place to place, and immigrants to the United States would work together to import and improve on the best Europe traditions. One result was a variety of dairy practices across the United States.

21st-century farms

There are 40,200 dairy farms in the United States, down from 111,800 in 1995.  In 2017 the top five dairy states are, in order by total milk production; California, Wisconsin, New York, Idaho,  and Texas. Dairy farming remains important in Florida, Minnesota, Ohio and Vermont.

Herd size in the US varies between 1,200 on the West Coast and Southwest, where large farms are commonplace, to roughly 50 in the Midwest and Northeast, where land-base is a significant limiting factor to herd size. The average herd size in the U.S. is about one hundred cows per farm but the median size is 900 cows with 49% of all cows residing on farms of 1000 or more cows.

Production by state
Production of milk per state in 2019 was as follows:

See also 

Animal husbandry
 Dairy
Dairy cattle
 Dairy farming
Dairy products
Factory farming
Family farm
 List of dairy products
 List of cheesemakers
 List of dairy products
 List of dairy product companies in the United States
Managed intensive grazing
Veal

Notes

Further reading
 Apps, Jerry. Cheese: The making of a Wisconsin tradition (University of Wisconsin Press, 2004).
 Bailey, Kenneth W. Marketing and pricing of milk and dairy products in the United States (Iowa State University Press, 1997).
 Blayney, Don P. "The Changing Landscape of U.S. Milk Production" (USDA, 2002) online
 Bowen, Sarah, and Kathryn De Master. "Wisconsin’s 'Happy Cows'? Articulating heritage and territory as new dimensions of locality." Agriculture and Human Values 31.4 (2014): 549-562. online
 Cardoso, Clarissa S., et al. "Imagining the ideal dairy farm." Journal of Dairy Science 99.2 (2016): 1663-1671.  online
 Dillon,  John J. Seven Decades of Milk - A History of New York's Dairy Industry (2010)
 DuPuis, E. Melanie. Nature's perfect food: How milk became America's drink (NYU Press, 2002). complete text online
 Fuquay, John W. ed. Encyclopedia of Dairy Sciences (2nd Edition, 4 vol 2011), comprehensive coverage
 Janus, Edward. Creating Dairyland: How caring for cows saved our soil, created our landscape, brought prosperity to our state, and still shapes our way of life in Wisconsin (Wisconsin Historical Society, 2011).
 Keillor, Steven J. "Agricultural change and crosscultural exchange: Danes, Americans, and dairying, 1880-1930." Agricultural History 67#4 (1993), p. 58+ online
 Khosrova, Elaine. Butter: A Rich History (2016) excerpt
 Kurlansky, Mark. Milk: A 10,000-Year History (2019)  excerpt
 McMurry, Sally. Transforming rural life: Dairying families and agricultural change, 1820-1885 (Johns Hopkins UP, 1995).
 Porter, John. The History and Economics of the New Hampshire Dairy Industry (University of New Hampshire Cooperative Extension Service, 2007).
 
 Steele, Catherine Baumgarten. "The Steele Brothers: Pioneers in California's Great Dairy Industry." California Historical Quarterly 20.3 (1941): 259-273. online 
 Switzer, Robert L. A Family Farm: Life on an Illinois Dairy Farm (2012)
 Valenze, Deborah. Milk: A Local and Global History (2011)  excerpt

Dairy industry
Dairy farming in the United States